Indonesia competed at the World Games 2017 in Wroclaw, Poland, from 20 July 2017 to 30 July 2017.

Competitors

Sport climbing
Indonesia has qualified at the 2017 World Games 1 athlete.

References 

Indonesia
2017 in Indonesian sport
Indonesia at multi-sport events